Running with Scissors may refer to:

 Running with Scissors (memoir), a 2002 book by Augusten Burroughs
 Running with Scissors (film), a 2006 adaptation of Burroughs's memoir, directed by Ryan Murphy
 Running with Scissors (band), a 1990s American rock band, or their 1993 eponymous album
 Running with Scissors ("Weird Al" Yankovic album), 1999
 Running with Scissors, an album by Janet Devlin, 2014
 Running with Scissors (company), an American video game developer
 "Running with Scissors" (Sex and the City), a 2000 TV episode